Pyotr Andreyevich Karatygin (11 July 1805, Saint Petersburg, Russian Empire – 6 October 1879, Saint Petersburg, Russian Empire) was a Russian dramatist and actor. The tragic actor Vasily Karatygin (1802-1853) was his brother.

Karatygin debuted on stage in 1823 and rose to fame performing in Alexander Griboyedov's Woe from Wit (the parts of Zagoretsky, Repetilov and Chatsky). From 1832 to 1838 he was head of the Drama department in the Saint Petersburg Theatre College, where he discovered and tutored several future Russian stage stars, including .

Pyotr Karatygin wrote 68 plays, 53 of them vaudevilles, mostly elaborate variations on foreign plays and Russian novels. In the 1860s and 1870s he wrote a series of short memoirs on the history of the Russian theatre. Edited and previewed by his son, Pyotr Karatygin's Notes were serialized by Russkaya Starina in 1872–1879, to much critical acclaim.

References

Literature
 Belyaev, M. The History of the Old Russian Vaudeville. The Jubilee Collection, Leningrad, 1925.
 Uspensky, V. The Classic Russian Vaudeville. 1959.
 Smirnov-Sokolsky, N. Pyotr Karatygin's Notebook.  Kniga Publishers,  1983.

Russian dramatists and playwrights
Male actors from Saint Petersburg
19th-century dramatists and playwrights from the Russian Empire
1805 births
1879 deaths
Writers from Saint Petersburg
19th-century male actors from the Russian Empire
Russian male stage actors
Burials at Tikhvin Cemetery